Viktor Mikhailovich Koklyushkin (27 November 1945, Moscow – 11 November 2021) was a Soviet and Russian satirist and television host.

Biography 
Viktor Koklyushkin  was born in 1945 in Moscow. He graduated from the Publishing and Printing College and the Higher theatrical courses GITIS. In 1969 he became the author of Koklyushkin page Literaturnaya Gazeta. Koklyushkin wrote monologues for such entertainers as Efim Shifrin, Yevgeny Petrosyan, Klara Novikova, Vladimir Vinokur, and Yelena Stepanenko.  The author of 10 books of short stories, novellas and novels.  Published in 1972 in Poland, Hungary, Czechoslovakia, Germany, Bulgaria. In 1987 he was awarded a literary prize by Yunost Magazine.

From 2012 to 2016, Koklyushkin was a columnist for Argumenty i Fakty.

Personal life 
He married for the second time. 
 Daughter Elga Sepp (born 1 June 1972), wife of the famous TV presenter Vladimir Solovyov.
 Son Yan (1987)

He died on November 12, 2021 from acute heart failure.

References

External links
 Viktor Koklyushkin online humorists Union
 Боевая слава старшины Коклюшкина

1945 births
2021 deaths
Writers from Moscow
Russian satirists
Russian Academy of Theatre Arts alumni
Russian male comedians
Russian television presenters
20th-century Russian writers
Russian humorists
Russian columnists
Soviet television presenters
Soviet dramatists and playwrights
Russian dramatists and playwrights